The 1883 New York Metropolitans finished with a 54–42 record, finishing in fourth place in the American Association. This was the first season in the Association for the Metropolitans, who had previously played as an independent team from 1880–1882.

Regular season

Season standings

Record vs. opponents

Opening Day lineup

Roster

Player stats

Batting

Starters by position
Note: Pos = Position; G = Games played; AB = At bats; H = Hits; Avg. = Batting average; HR = Home runs

Other batters
Note: G = Games played; AB = At bats; H = Hits; Avg. = Batting average; HR = Home runs

Pitching

Starting pitchers
Note: G = Games pitched; IP = Innings pitched; W = Wins; L = Losses; ERA = Earned run average; SO = Strikeouts

References
 1883 New York Metropolitans team page at Baseball Reference

New York Metropolitans seasons
New York Metropolitans season
New York Metropolitans season
19th century in Manhattan
Washington Heights, Manhattan